Professor Yfrah Neaman, OBE FGSM (13 February 1923 – 4 January 2003), was a concert violinist and teacher.

Early life 
Neaman was born in Sidon, Lebanon. He lived in Tel Aviv until 1932 when he moved to Paris to study at the Paris Conservatoire. In 1937 at the age of 14 he won the Premier Prix, the youngest ever student to do so. After his studies in Paris, Neaman travelled to London to study with Carl Flesch, and in 1939 returned to France to study with Jacques Thibaud.  Following the German invasion of France in 1940, Neaman settled in London where he continued his studies with Max Rostal.

Career 

Once settled in London Neaman met Dame Myra Hess and Howard Ferguson, both of whom became life-long friends. They invited him to play for their National Gallery lunchtime concert series and during the next few years Neaman gave 15 National Gallery concerts. 

Neaman taught at the Guildhall School of Music and Drama from 1958 until his death, first as Professor of Violin, then as Head of Advanced Solo Studies. In 1998 he was made Emeritus Professor in recognition of his 40 years' service to the School. Neaman gave masterclasses all over the world and as a guest Professor had his own class four times a year at the Peter Cornelius Konservatorium in Mainz, Germany, from 1973 until his death. He was also Specialist Consultant to Wells Cathedral Music School for over 30 years. He held the Hengrave Summer Course for more than 25 years.

Awards 
Neaman received many international and UK awards, including the Gutenberg-Plakette of the City of Mainz, Germany, in 1997, the Cobbet Medal of the Worshipful Company of Musicians in 1997, and the Freedom of the City of London in 1980. He was appointed an Officer of the Order of the British Empire (OBE) in 1983.

Death
Yfrah Neaman died of cancer on January 4, 2003 at age 79 in London, England, survived by his wife Gillian, son Sam and daughter Rachel.

See also
List of British Jews

References

External links
 The Guardian obituary
 Independent obituary
 The Times obituary
 Guildhall School of Music & Drama obituary
 
Yfrah Neaman, 'International Competitions. A Constructive or Destructive Influence', American String Teacher, vol.28, issue 4, 1 November 1978
Performances of Yfrah Neaman at BBC Proms
History of the Summer Academy – Varna Summer IMF
Yfrah Neaman Discography

1923 births
2003 deaths
Lebanese Jews
British Jews
British classical violinists
British people of Lebanese-Jewish descent
British male violinists
Officers of the Order of the British Empire
Jewish classical musicians
Violin pedagogues
Jewish British musicians
Jewish violinists
Lebanese emigrants to the United Kingdom
20th-century classical violinists
20th-century British musicians
20th-century British male musicians
Male classical violinists
Lebanese expatriates in Mandatory Palestine
Lebanese expatriates in France